Greg Jacina (born May 22, 1982) is a Canadian former professional ice hockey Winger. He played 14 games in the National Hockey League with the Florida Panthers during the 2005–06 and 2006–07 seasons, though most of his career, which lasted from 2003 to 2015, was spent in the minor leagues and then in Europe.

Biography
Jacina was born in Guelph, Ontario. As a youth, he played in the 1996 Quebec International Pee-Wee Hockey Tournament with a minor ice hockey team from North York. He played major junior hockey in the Ontario Hockey League, before signing as an undrafted free agent to an entry-level contract with the Florida Panthers on August 12, 2003. In the Panthers organization, Jacina made his NHL debut and played in the 2005–06 and 2006–07 seasons in the NHL.

He signed for Lukko Rauma of the SM-liiga in Finland, for the 2007–08 season but due to injury he could not complete on game that season. He started the following 2008–09 season in Lukko before after 16 games he switched to Tappara. After 10 games in Tampere, Jacina continued his journeyman campaign in moving to VIK Västerås HK of the HockeyAllsvenskan.

On May 8, 2014, Jacina agree to a one-year contract extension to remain in Notthingham of the EIHL.

Career statistics

Regular season and playoffs

References

External links
 

1982 births
Living people
Augusta Lynx players
Canadian expatriate ice hockey players in England
Canadian expatriate ice hockey players in Denmark
Canadian expatriate ice hockey players in Finland
Canadian expatriate ice hockey players in Norway
Canadian expatriate ice hockey players in Sweden
Canadian ice hockey right wingers
Florida Panthers players
Frederikshavn White Hawks players
Guelph Storm players
Ice hockey people from Ontario
Lukko players
Mississauga IceDogs players
Nottingham Panthers players
Odense Bulldogs players
Owen Sound Attack players
Rochester Americans players
Rosenborg IHK players
San Antonio Rampage players
Sportspeople from Guelph
Tappara players
Undrafted National Hockey League players
VIK Västerås HK players
Canadian expatriate ice hockey players in the United States
Ritten Sport players